The 1932 Florida–Alabama hurricane was a tropical cyclone that made two separate landfalls on the United States, causing devastation in affected areas. The third named storm and hurricane of the 1932 Atlantic hurricane season, it developed from a tropical disturbance north of Hispaniola on August 26. Slowly moving towards the west-northwest, the system intensified to tropical storm strength before making landfall on South Florida early on August 30. After crossing the Florida peninsula and entering the Gulf of Mexico, the system reached peak intensity as a Category 1 hurricane, before subsequently making its final landfall near the Mississippi–Alabama border on September 1. Over land, the hurricane weakened, and after becoming an extratropical cyclone on September 2, merged with another extratropical system over Quebec on September 4.

At the storm's initial landfall in southern Florida, heavy rains and strong winds caused extensive damage to crops, particularly to avocado and citrus. As the strengthening hurricane moved to the northwest through the Gulf of Mexico, it generated strong surf that caused severe damage to coastal areas across western Florida. At its second landfall, hurricane force winds were produced across a wide swath of the coast. Agricultural lands in coastal regions of Mississippi and Alabama were damaged by strong winds and heavy rain. The hurricane caused one indirect death and $228,500 in total damages across its path.

Meteorological history

A tropical disturbance was first noted southeast of Puerto Rico on August 24. Steadily intensifying, the depression intensified to tropical storm strength at 1800 UTC on August 27. In the Atlantic hurricane reanalysis project, it was evidenced that the storm may have been a hurricane upon landfall on Florida.

After entering the gulf, the tropical storm proceeded to organize, strengthening into hurricane intensity early on August 31. After making landfall, the hurricane gradually weakened over land as it curved towards the northeast, weakening to tropical storm strength at 1200 UTC on September 1. The weakening system transitioned into an extratropical cyclone over northern Mississippi the following day, after subsequently developing frontal boundaries. The extratropical system strengthened slightly as it accelerated towards the northeast, but was later absorbed by a larger extratropical system over Quebec by 1800 UTC on September 4.

Preparations, impact, and aftermath

Florida
Prior to the storm's first landfall in southern Florida, the Weather Bureau issued hurricane warnings beginning on August 29 for areas of Florida's east coast from Palm Beach south to Key West, while storm warnings were issued from Key West to Boca Grande on the peninsula's western coast. Electrical power was purposely stopped in Miami as a precautionary measure prior to the storm's landfall. Two Red Cross officials were sent to Miami to monitor the area during the storm's passage. Other relief agencies were also preparing supplies in the event of an emergency. In Pahokee and Belle Glade, an estimated 2,000 people evacuated to Okeechobee, fearing a repeat of the 1928 Okeechobee hurricane.

Most of the damage associated with the tropical storm's first landfall in Florida was confined south of 27 °N. Recently planted seed beds were washed away by heavy rains associated with the storm. A Miami weather station reported  of rain in a 24-hour period ending on August 30, setting a record for that station. A portion of the MacArthur Causeway, which connects Miami to Miami Beach, was washed out due to the winds, but did not affect traffic. Rainfall in St. Petersburg measured , while Fort Myers measured  of rain. The heavy rains also flooded streets in parts of Sarasota, Florida, and strong winds caused minor power outages. Communication lines between Fort Myers and Everglades, Florida also went down during the storm. Strong winds were responsible for destroying 2–25% of avocado and citrus trees along the path of the tropical storm. Grapefruit crops also suffered loses due to strong winds. Firefighters in Hollywood were forced to stop extinguishing a fire after winds damaged their equipment. The fire would eventually cause $20,000 in damages.

Before the hurricane's second landfall, another hurricane warning was issued for portions of the state, for areas of the coast from Panama City westward. Boats from Naval Air Station Pensacola were taken to nearby bayous ahead of the storm. Other ships were also sheltered as a precautionary measure. As the hurricane moved towards the Gulf Coast region, the hurricane caused strong storm surge and generated rough seas, disrupting coastal and marine activities. In Madeira Beach, the passing hurricane caused above-average tides that moved  further inland than normal. Offshore, two fishing boats attempting to cross Tampa Bay had to be rescued after they became stranded in the rough seas generated by the tropical storm. In Dog Island, nine people were rescued from the Cuban schooner Asturias after it washed up on the island shore. Off of Apalachicola, nine fishing boats sunk due to the waves. The strong surf alone was responsible for about $1,000 in damages. Strong storm surge off of Pensacola caused water levels that were the highest in the area in several years. Sections of a pier at Pensacola Beach were washed away by the strong waves. Five fishermen were initially reported drowned after their fishing boat struck a reef and was swamped by the storm surge in Pensacola Bay. However, the men were later reported safe at a coast guard life saving station. The misreport was likely due a lack of communication with the station. Another three men went missing after they departed in a small boat in aid of another boat offshore Pensacola.

Inland effects of the hurricane's second landfall in Florida were mostly confined to areas of the Florida Panhandle west of Apalachicola. Cotton crops in Okaloosa and Escambia counties were damaged due to the wind and rain effects of the hurricane. Numerous pears were also blown off of trees by the strong winds. Property damage in Pensacola was relatively minor, and was limited to awnings, windows, and signboards. In Pensacola Beach, communications were disrupted due to the storm.
A 12–year old boy in Pensacola died after touching an active electric wire that had fallen during the storm. Total damages in the Pensacola area were estimated to amount to around $100,000.

Mississippi and Alabama
Hurricane warnings were posted by the Weather Bureau for the entire Alabama coast, and portions of the Mississippi coast from Biloxi eastward prior to the storm. Merchants in potentially affected areas prepared their stores ahead of the hurricane. The potential storm surge threat forced boats in Biloxi to be taken to shelter in a nearby landlocked harbor.

Hurricane force winds were felt in both states when the storm made landfall. Pear and pecan trees were severely damaged by the strong winds caused by the hurricane, while orange trees were defoliated along coastal regions. Winds also extensively damaged cotton and corn crops. Heavy rains also helped to damage crops. Other reports of at least  of rain were common along the Mississippi–Alabama border. Sections of the Mobile waterfront were submerged by the hurricane's storm surge. The high surf also flooded Bayou LaBatre and Bayou Coden in Mobile. Total property damage in the city amounted to $105,000 in damages. In Gulfport, Mississippi, damage was confined primarily to trees, communication lines, and small craft. The tornado destroyed two homes and several barns and injured four people in its  path, causing $2,500 in damages.

See also

Hurricane Five (1936)
Hurricane Erin (1995)
Hurricane Four (1901)

Notes

References

1932 natural disasters in the United States
Florida Alabama
Category 1 Atlantic hurricanes
Hurricanes in Florida
Hurricanes in Alabama
1932 in Florida
1932 in Alabama